Escuadrilla Acrobática Cruz del Sur ("Southern Cross Aerobatic Flight") is the aerobatic demonstration team of the Argentine Air Force ( Fuerza Aérea Argentina), established in 1962 as part of the 4th Air Group based in Mendoza. It was dissolved and reformed several times, and is currently based at Morón, Buenos Aires.

History 

As part of the celebrations of the 50th anniversary of the Argentine Air Force creation, in 1961 it was ordered to different units to create display teams. The Southern Cross aerobatic team was created in early 1962 by the 1st Fighter-bomber Group ( Grupo 1 Caza-Bombardero) of the 4th Air Brigade ( IV Brigada Aérea) of the Argentine Air Force, based at Los Tamarindos, Mendoza. It operated six F-86-F Sabre aircraft until its disbandment in December of the same year. Sabres would still be used occasionally in aerobatics until 1985, though not using the team's name.

The team was reformed in 1997 with seven Sukhoi Su-29AR, and disbanded again in 2010 due to budget and maintenance problems. It was based at the IVth Air Brigade located at El Plumerillo Air Base in Mendoza province (Argentina).

In 2012 the Air Force reestablished the team with six upgraded IA-63 Pampa II  based at Morón Air Base, in Morón, Buenos Aires.

Aircraft used

References

Notes

Online sources 
  El Escuadrón de Alta Acrobacia Cruz del Sur. Por Hernan Longoni 
   Resurge la Escuadrilla Acrobática “Cruz del Sur”
 Escuadrilla Acrobatica Cruz del Sur, Reseña Histórica - Taringa! website

Further reading

External links

  Official site
 Su-29AR Southern Cross Aerobatic Flight / Flickr
   pictures of  IA-63
  pictures Su-29
 pictures Su-29
  Youtube clip Cruz del Sur

Aerobatic teams
Argentine Air Force